The 2019 Sudamérica Rugby Sevens Olympic Qualifying Tournament for the 2020 Summer Olympics was held on 29–30 June 2019. The winner of the tournament represents Sudamérica Rugby, with the runner-up and third place participant qualified for a 2020 repechage tournament. The highest ranking team not already qualified for the 2019 Pan American Games will also be eligible for that tournament.

Teams

Pool stage
All times in Chile Standard Time (UTC−04:00)

Pool A

Pool B

Placement rounds
Ninth place

Seventh place

Fifth place

Olympic Qualification

Standings

See also
 Rugby sevens at the 2019 Pan American Games

References

Rugby sevens at the 2020 Summer Olympics – Men's qualification
2019 rugby sevens competitions
International rugby union competitions hosted by Chile
Rugby sevens competitions in South America
2019 in South American rugby union
2019 in Chilean sport
June 2019 sports events in South America